Yang Zhengwu (born January 1941) is an ethnic Tujia Chinese politician. He was born in Longshan County, Xiangxi Tujia and Miao Autonomous Prefecture, Hunan. He was Chinese Communist Party committee secretary of his home county (1978–1981), his home prefecture (1983–1990) and his home province (1998–2005). He was governor (1995–1998) and People's Congress Chairman (1999–2006) of his home province.

References

1941 births
People's Republic of China politicians from Hunan
Chinese Communist Party politicians from Hunan
Governors of Hunan
Tujia people
Living people
Politicians from Xiangxi